King's Road Chelsea railway station is a proposed station on Crossrail 2, a planned underground railway line through London in the United Kingdom. If constructed, the station would serve the King's Road area of  Chelsea.

Crossrail 2 is currently considered the fourth major rail project in the capital after the Thameslink Programme, East London line extension, and Crossrail 1.

Location

According to the June 2008 safeguarding directions, the surface structures of interest lie either side of Dovehouse Street (including Dovehouse Green) at its junction with Kings Road and some small buildings on the south side of the road opposite.

Following the 2013 public consultation, revised plans were published in June 2014 by the Mayor of London which indicate two possible alignments for the railway tunnels along with two potential sites for a station in Chelsea:
 on the corner of King's Road and Dovehouse Street, on the site which is currently occupied by Chelsea Fire Station;
 on a site further south-west, between the King's Road and Cheyne Walk, close to Milman's Street and the River Thames

The location is under continual debate and eventually may be influenced by the Royal Borough of Kensington and Chelsea, London Mayor and residents and local businesses on Kings Road. In the 2013 survey 20% of residents opposed or strongly opposed a site on Dovehouse Green. Further options for a location to build Chelsea tube station include:
 a quarter mile west from the primary proposal and at the junction of Beaufort Street and Kings Road, or
 a three-quarter mile south-west and adjacent to Cremorne Gardens at Cremorne and World's End high-density residence estates. This stop would be called Chelsea Riverside.

There was discussion to add a Battersea Village stop (on the west side of Battersea Park, to complement Battersea Nine Elms (Northern line extension to Battersea) on the eastern side of Battersea Park); cost may deter an additional station.

Name
In the 2015 consultation for Crossrail 2, the station was referred to as King's Road Chelsea.

History

A tube line from Chelsea to Hackney was first proposed at the beginning of the twentieth century. In 1904 a bill was put before Parliament, but was defeated by the political allies of rival tube constructor Charles Yerkes. It was proposed again in the late 1960s and has been on the long-term agenda since then. An integral part of the plan was to build a new station in the centre of Chelsea along the Kings Road, which is not currently served directly by any tube or national rail station.

It was safeguarded as part of a potential route in 1991 and 2007. Kensington and Chelsea London Borough Council are strong supporters of Chelsea station, as well as returning  into the project after it was dropped from the route.

Public opinion
During the public consultation in 2015, local residents raised concerns about TfL's proposals, citing concerns about disruption during construction and the potentially negative effect of a station on the character of the local area. Opponents have included actress Felicity Kendal and broadcaster Loyd Grossman. According to media reports, the station does not appear in TfL's business case documentation of March 2017, and commentators have suggested that a station at this location may be scrapped. , King's Road Chelsea railway station still features on official TfL publicity.

Services

References

Proposed Chelsea-Hackney Line stations
Chelsea, London
King's Road, Chelsea, London